The 1954 Oregon Webfoots football team represented the University of Oregon as a member of the Pacific Coast Conference (PCC) during the 1954 college football season. In their fourth season under head coach Len Casanova, the Webfoots compiled a 6–4 record (5–3 in PCC, third), and outscored their opponents 218 to 159. The team played its home games on campus in Eugene at Hayward Field, and at Multnomah Stadium in Portland.

On a morning deer hunt east of Eugene in mid-October, senior guard Jack Patera of Portland mistakenly shot and killed former Oregon teammate Ken Sweitzer, a graduate assistant. It was ruled accidental and he was cleared of negligence. This was the second death for the team in two months; in mid-August, junior guard Doyle Higdon of Cottage Grove was killed in a logging explosion while removing stumps.

Oregon won all four games against northwest PCC opponents; their next sweep came 26 years later.

Schedule

References

Oregon
Oregon Ducks football seasons
Oregon Webfoots football